The Pajeú River is a tributary of the São Francisco River in the state of Pernambuco in northeastern Brazil.

Etymology
The name of the river is of Tupi origin, and means "river of the witchdoctor".

See also
 List of rivers of Pernambuco

References

Rivers of Pernambuco